Robert Scott Jackson (born March 5, 1957) is an American former competition swimmer who represented the United States at the 1976 Summer Olympics in Montreal, Quebec.  He placed sixth in the final of the men's 100-meter backstroke with a time of 57.69 seconds.  Two years later he won the gold medal in the same event at the 1978 World Aquatics Championships in Berlin, Germany.

See also
 List of University of Arizona people
 List of World Aquatics Championships medalists in swimming (men)

References

1957 births
Living people
American male backstroke swimmers
Arizona Wildcats men's swimmers
Olympic swimmers of the United States
Sportspeople from Alhambra, California
Swimmers at the 1975 Pan American Games
Swimmers at the 1976 Summer Olympics
Swimmers at the 1979 Pan American Games
World Aquatics Championships medalists in swimming
Pan American Games gold medalists for the United States
Pan American Games silver medalists for the United States
Pan American Games bronze medalists for the United States
Pan American Games medalists in swimming
Medalists at the 1975 Pan American Games
Medalists at the 1979 Pan American Games
20th-century American people
21st-century American people